The 2002 Triple J Hottest 100, announced on 26 January 2003, was the tenth such countdown of the most popular songs of the year, according to listeners of the Australian radio station Triple J. As in previous years, a CD featuring 39 (not necessarily the top 39) songs was released. For the first time, a DVD, containing film clips of songs from the Hottest 100 was also released. This was also the last time that phone voting was allowed; in the 2003 poll, only internet voting was permitted. SMS voting was removed for the 2003 poll but was reinstated in the 2004 event

When the announcers got to the number one track, they announced that rapper Nelly's song Hot in Herre was top, and began playing it. Part way through the song, they declared that it had been a joke, broke the CD on air, and began playing Queens of the Stone Age's No One Knows.

The band Salmon Hater came in at number 26 with their song 6.66 after Triple J morning show hosts Adam Spencer and Wil Anderson made an effort to rig the event, telling listeners to vote for the otherwise unlikely candidate.

Full list
Note: Australian artists 

Australian artists (marked with a green background ) made up 50 of the 100 tracks.
<p>It was announced that song 101 was Jebediah - Nothing Lasts Forever. If it had reached number 100 and Adam Spencer's troll song by Salmon Hater was deemed ineligible, this would've been Jebediah's 10th charting song in 6 consecutive years.

Artists with multiple entries
Ten Entries
Dave Grohl (including 5 with Queens of The Stone Age, 4 with Foo Fighters and one with Nirvana)(1, 11, 12, 13, 23, 44, 48, 55, 56, 81)
Five entries
Queens of the Stone Age (1, 44, 48, 56, 81)
Silverchair (10, 25, 35, 62, 76)
Four entries
Grinspoon (2, 14, 15, 47)
The Vines (5, 19, 21, 30)
Foo Fighters (11, 13, 23, 55)
Three entries
The Waifs (3, 80, 96)
Machine Gun Fellatio (6, 8, 59)
Eminem (7, 17, 86)
System of a Down (18, 37, 87)
Coldplay (39, 69, 100)
Two entries
28 Days (41, 83)
Audioslave (20, 72)
Red Hot Chili Peppers (9, 16)
Weezer (24, 73)
george (32, 43)
Waikiki (36, 67)
Jamiroquai (50, 57)
Basement Jaxx (53, 71)
The Streets (42, 77)
Bodyjar (31, 99)

Top 10 Albums of 2002
Bold indicates winner of the Hottest 100.

CD release
The double CD titled triple j – Hottest 100: Vol 10 Various Artists was released 2003-03-03. It is a compilation of 39 of the top 100 songs.

DVD release

 Queens of the Stone Age – No One Knows
 The Vines – Get Free
 Coldplay – In My Place
 Rocket Science – Being Followed
 Sonic Animation – I'm A DJ (Original)
 The Hives – Hate to Say I Told You So
 Salmon Hater – 6.66
 The Waifs – London Still
 Ben Lee – Something Borrowed, Something Blue
 N*E*R*D – Rock Star (Jason Nevins Remix Edit)
 Groove Armada – Purple Haze – Edit
 Grinspoon – Chemical Heart
 Pacifier – Comfort Me
 Waikiki – Here Comes September
 Antiskeptic – Called
 The Streets – Don't Mug Yourself
 1200 Techniques – Karma
 28 Days – What's The Deal?
 Badly Drawn Boy – Something To Talk About
 The Living End – One Said to the Other
 Bodyjar – One in a Million
 Darren Hanlon – Punk's Not Dead
 Weezer – Keep Fishin?
 Silverchair – The Greatest View
 Motor Ace – Carry On
 Ms Dynamite – Dy-Na-Mi-Tee
 The Whitlams – Fall for you
 John Butler Trio – Home Is Where The Heart Is
 Machine Translations – She Wears A Mask
 Cartman – Shock (Living Without You)
 The Drugs – The Bold and the Beautiful
 Elvis Presley vs JXL – A Little Less Conversation

See also
2002 in music

References 

2002
2002 in Australian music
2002 record charts